Kurt Maeder (born 10 September 1952) is a Swiss equestrian. He competed in the individual jumping event at the 1972 Summer Olympics.

References

1952 births
Living people
Swiss male equestrians
Olympic equestrians of Switzerland
Equestrians at the 1972 Summer Olympics
Place of birth missing (living people)